The second season of the French television series Nouvelle Star on M6 began on 11 February 2004. With season two, the new name was adopted after the programme was known in its inaugural season 1 broadcast from 27 March to 10 July 2003) as À la Recherche de la Nouvelle Star. On the final broadcast on 13 May 2004, the title was won by Steeve Estatof.

Two of the judges, André Manoukian and Dove Attia returned, but judges Varda Kakon and
Lionel Florence were replaced by Marianne James and Manu Katché. Benjamin Castaldi continued to host the show for a second season.

In the final, Steeve Estatof was declared winner by public vote, with Julien as runner-up.

Finals

Finalists
(ages stated at time of contest)

Live show details

Pre Live Show (11 March 2004)

Live Show 1 (18 March 2004)
Theme: R&B Hits

Live Show 2 (25 March 2004)
Theme: Pop Hits

Live Show 3 (1 April 2004)
Theme: Hits of the Last 15 Years

Live Show 4 (8 April 2004)
Theme: Number One French Hits

Live Show 5 (15 April 2004)
Theme: Pop-Rock Hits

Live Show 6 (22 April 2004)
Theme: The Sun

Live Show 7 (29 April 2004)
Theme: Love Songs

Live Show 8: Semi-final (6 May 2004)

Live final (13 May 2004)

External links 
 Official site

Season 02
2004 French television seasons